The Shine Again Stakes is an American Thoroughbred horse race held annually at Pimlico Race Course in Baltimore, Maryland. Contested over a distance of one mile and one sixteenth (eight and a half furlongs) on the dirt, it is open to fillies and mares three-years-old and up that are Registered Maryland-breds.

Run during the latter part of May during Preakness week. The race was named in honor of Shine Again, a fourth generation homebred in Allaire duPont's stable. She was brilliant over three seasons of competition in which she was named Maryland-bred horse of the Year in 2003, Maryland-bred champion older mare in three consecutive years while earning state-bred champion sprinter title in two of those years. She retired after the 2003 season as the ninth leading Maryland-bred money earner of all time, with $1,271,840. From 34 career starts, she won 14 races (eight stakes), was second 10 times (eight stakes) and third in seven others (five stakes).

Shine Again was a daughter of Wild Again out of the Two Punch mare Shiner. Shine Again was under the guidance of Hall of Fame trainer Allen Jerkins, she won four stakes races that season including the grade one Ballerina Handicap at Saratoga Race Course plus the grade two First Flight Handicap and placed in four other graded stakes races. The very next year she returned to defend her titles in the Ballerina and the First Flight and won both, she also had five graded stakes placings including the grade one Ruffian Handicap. She just missed the three-peat in the Ballerina at age six, finishing second by a neck. In that year she won the grade two Genuine Risk Handicap while placing in five other additional graded stakes races.

Records 

Speed record: 
  miles - 1:45.40 - Katie's Love (2006)

Most wins by a jockey:
 3 - Luis Garcia    (2006, 2008 & 2009)

Most wins by a trainer:
 No trainer has won the Shine Again Stakes more than once

Winners of the Shine Again Stakes

See also 

 Shine Again Stakes top three finishers and starters
 Pimlico Race Course
 List of graded stakes at Pimlico Race Course

References

Ungraded stakes races in the United States
Pimlico Race Course
Horse races in Maryland
Recurring sporting events established in 2006